Allancastria is a genus of Palaearctic swallowtail butterflies in the subfamily Parnassiinae. Five species are known. The genus has a complex history.

Taxonomy 
The genus consists of the following species:
 Allancastria caucasica - (Lederer, 1864)
 Allancastria cerisyi - (Godart, 1824) eastern festoon
 Allancastria cretica - (Rebel, 1904)
 Allancastria deyrollei - (Oberthür, 1869)
 Allancastria louristana - (Le Cerf, 1908)

Food plant 
Species in this genus feed on Aristolochia species.

References

External links

TOL
Parnassius of the World
NHM Nomenclature.

Papilionidae
Butterfly genera
Taxa named by Felix Bryk